The 500 meters distance for women in the 2013–14 ISU Speed Skating World Cup was contested over 12 races on six occasions, out of a total of six World Cup occasions for the season, with the first occasion taking place in Calgary, Alberta, Canada, on 8–10 November 2013, and the final occasion taking place in Heerenveen, Netherlands, on 14–16 March 2014.

The defending champion was Lee Sang-hwa of South Korea.

On 9 November, in the second race in Calgary, Lee improved her own world record with a time of 36.74 seconds. Six days later, in the first race in Salt Lake City, she improved the record a further 17/100, to 36.57 seconds. Amazingly, the next day, for the third time within a week, she again broke the world record, this time with a time of 36.36 seconds.

Lee won the first seven races, but did not to participate in the rest of the races. This allowed for three other skaters to pass her in aggregate points. Instead, Olga Fatkulina of Russia won the cup, while Heather Richardson of the United States came second, and Jenny Wolf of Germany came third. Lee ended up in fourth place.

Top three

Race medallists

Standings 
Standings as of 16 March 2014 (end of the season).

References 

 
Women 0500
ISU